Abbas Jadidi (born 13 January 1969) is an Iranian wrestler who competed in the Freestyle Heavyweight (90–100 kg) category at the 1996 Summer Olympics, losing to Kurt Angle and winning the silver medal. He was suspended from competing for two years for doping. He was elected as a member of Tehran City Council in 2013 local elections.

Achievements
 Olympic Silver 1996 Atlanta
 World Champion 1998
 World Bronze 1995, 1999
 World Cup Champion 1998
 Asian Champion 1993, 1996, 1998

References

External links
Profile

1969 births
Living people
Olympic wrestlers of Iran
Wrestlers at the 1996 Summer Olympics
Wrestlers at the 2000 Summer Olympics
Iranian male sport wrestlers
Olympic silver medalists for Iran
Iranian sportspeople in doping cases
Place of birth missing (living people)
Asian Games gold medalists for Iran
Asian Games silver medalists for Iran
Olympic medalists in wrestling
Asian Games medalists in wrestling
Wrestlers at the 1998 Asian Games
Wrestlers at the 2002 Asian Games
World Wrestling Championships medalists
Iranian sportsperson-politicians
Medalists at the 1996 Summer Olympics
Medalists at the 1998 Asian Games
Medalists at the 2002 Asian Games
Tehran Councillors 2013–2017
Recipients of the Order of Courage (Iran)
Asian Wrestling Championships medalists
20th-century Iranian people
21st-century Iranian people
World Wrestling Champions